Box Hill North is a suburb of Melbourne, Victoria, Australia, 14 km east from Melbourne's Central Business District, located within the City of Whitehorse local governPoment area. Box Hill North recorded a population of 12,337 at the 2021 census.

Box Hill North's boundaries are Koonung Creek in the north, Elgar Road in the west, Middleborough Road in the east, and Thames Street in the south. The eastern part of Box Hill North is also known as Kerrimuir.

In the 12-month period to January 2020 Box Hill North reported a median house price of A$1.03 million for a three bedroom house.

History

Early settlement 
The earliest permanent European presence in the area was Arundel Wrighte's pastoral lease, established in 1838. A Wesleyan Methodist Chapel was built of local stone in 1858 and is the oldest building in the area.

Post-war development 
Although central Box Hill was established in 1861, Box Hill North was largely developed and organised as a suburban area following the Second World War during a period of suburbanisation and development of its capabilities as a residential neighbourhood.  Prior to the end of World War II, much of the area remained rural and mostly filled with orchards and dairy farms. As the post-war boom bought further reorganisation and development opportunities, corresponding local public services were developed. The Kerrimuir Post Office opened on 1 April 1955 and Box Hill North Post Office opened on 1 August 1955 as the population increased, requiring more dedicated postal services to meet the demands of an increasing population.

Demographics 
At the 2021 Australian census, there is recorded a total population of 12,337 people. At the 2011 Australian census, there was a recorded total population of 10,971 people, wherein 11.2% of residents reported being born in China.

Shopping

Box Hill North has many shopping areas at the following locations;
 The corner of Station Street and Woodhouse Grove
 The corner of Elgar Road and Woodhouse Grove
 The corner of Middleborough Road and Springfield Road
 Trawool Street, between Dorking Road and Tynong Street
 Second Avenue, between Toogoods Rise and Cherry Orchard Rise
A better array of shops are just up the road by bus to Box Hill Central in the south, the Westfield owned Doncaster Shoppingtown in the north and North Blackburn Shopping Centre to the east.

Box Hill North has a light industrial area in Lexton Street, at the Middleborough Road end of the street. It includes hot food snack bars open during weekday business hours to service the light industrial businesses and several shops and factory outlets.

Education

Box Hill North has two public primary schools; Kerrimuir Primary School and Box Hill North Primary School and Kindergarten. Another school, St Clare's Catholic Primary School, closed down in the early 2000s.

The suburb has one secondary school, Berengarra Secondary School, located on the old site for St Clare's Catholic Primary School. Berengarra Secondary School caters for students experiencing problems in mainstream schools. The school teaches students from Years 7 to 10.

Koonung Secondary College, Box Hill High School and Blackburn High School are in the neighbouring suburbs of Mont Albert North, Box Hill and Blackburn North respectively.

Transport 
The major north–south roads in Box Hill North are (from east–west); Elgar Road, Station Street, Dorking Road and Middleborough Road. Major east–west roads include (from north–south); Eastern Freeway, Woodhouse Grove, Wimmera Street/Springfield Road and Thames/Margaret Street.

The closest train station is Box Hill, located underneath Box Hill Central in Box Hill. The station is located on both the Belgrave and Lilydale lines.

The suburb has three tram routes within a five kilometre radius. The routes are;
 Route 48 to Victoria Harbour Docklands; in Balwyn North on Doncaster Road
 Route 70 to Waterfront City Docklands; in Burwood on Riversdale Road
 Route 109 to Port Melbourne; in Box Hill on Whitehorse Road
Buses run on Elgar Road, Station Street, Dorking Road and Middleborough Road, as well as various side streets.

Routes on Elgar Road;
 Route 281 – Templestowe to Deakin University
 Route 293 – Greensborough station to Box Hill
 Route 302 – Lonsdale Street to Box Hill
 Route 304 – Lonsdale Street to Westfield Doncaster (Belmore Road to Eastern Freeway only)
Routes on Station Street;
  Route 903 – Altona station to Mordialloc station
Routes on Dorking Road;
 Route 270 – Box Hill to Mitcham station
Routes on Middleborough Road;
 Route 279 -–Box Hill to Doncaster
 Route 303 -–City (Queen Street) to Ringwood North
Routes on side streets;
 Route 612 – Box Hill to Chadstone Shopping Centre

Sports clubs
 East Box Hill Cricket Club
 Box Hill North Football Club Inc
 Whitehorse Pioneers Football Club Inc
 SFX Whitehorse Colts Junior Football Club Inc
 North Box Hill Tennis Club (NBHTC)(Frank Sedgman Reserve)
 Elgar Park Cricket Club (Previously Box Hill Church of Christ Cricket Club)
 Box Hill North Cricket Club
 Kerrimuir United Cricket Club
 Eastern Gymnastics Club (Previously Box Hill Gymnastics Club)
 Box Hill Little Athletics Centre
 Whitehorse Pole Vault Club
 Koonung Comets Basketball Club

Parkland

There are many parks in the suburb, including Elgar Park, Bushy Creek Park, Memorial Park, Springfield Park, Tassell's Park, Frank Sedgman Reserve, Hagenauer Reserve, Halligan Park, Eram Park as well as many smaller, often unnamed, reserves. Of these, only Elgar Park and Springfield Park contain an Australian rules football oval. Most of these parks have walking and bicycle paths and children's playgrounds.

As well as this, there is two multi purpose tracks run through the suburb. The Bushy Creek Trail runs from the intersection at Elgar Road and Belmore Road, near Elgar Park, to the intersection at Dorking Road and Wimmera Street, near Springfield Park. The Koonung Creek Trial also runs through the north of the suburb, connecting it with neighbouring suburbs, such as Mont Albert North, Blackburn North, Nunawading, and Balwyn North.

Religion

The residents of Box Hill North profess several religions, although the majority are either Christian or non-religious. There are five churches in the suburb; 
 Manningham Uniting Church - Woodhouse Grove
 St Clare Catholic Church - corner of Woodhouse Grove and Killara Street
 GO Evangelical Church - Elgar Road
 True Jesus Church - corner of Watts Street and Medway Street
 St Philip's Anglican Church - Lawford Street

See also
 City of Box Hill – Box Hill North was previously within this former local government area.

References

External links
Australian Places - Box Hill North
City of Whitehorse

Suburbs of Melbourne
Suburbs of the City of Whitehorse